White House Farm is a historic home located at Kennedyville, Kent County, Maryland, United States. The oldest section of the -story stuccoed brick house was built in 1721. The house is located on an elevated site, within an informally landscaped yard which retains evidence of historic terracing. Also on the property is a late-19th-century brick dairy.

White House Farm was built in 1721 by Daniel Perkins who was a miller and stone cutter, newly arrived from New Hampshire.  He arrived in Kent County in 1710 and obtained the milling rights to dam the West branch of Morgan Creek.  Remnants of this dam are still visible from Rt 213.  He not only built a small house there with the flour mill but also a sawmill and a fulling mill. After acquiring more property in 1720, he began building the larger brick home up on the hill for his family, over-looking his mills.

The White House Farm was listed on the National Register of Historic Places in 1992.

References

External links
, including photo from 1991, at Maryland Historical Trust

Chestertown, Maryland
Houses in Kent County, Maryland
Houses on the National Register of Historic Places in Maryland
Houses completed in 1721
National Register of Historic Places in Kent County, Maryland
1721 establishments in the Thirteen Colonies